Bob Bailey (born Robert Bainter Bailey; June 13, 1913 – August 13, 1983) was an American actor who performed mostly on radio but also appeared in films.

Early years
Bailey's parents were actor Edwin B. Bailey and actress Grace Lockwood Bailey, both of whom performed in early 1900s stock theater. He made his first appearance on stage with his mother when he was 10 days old. He took his middle name from actress Fay Bainter, who was his godmother. He began performing in his parents' stock company when he was 4 years old and continued to work there until he was 15.

Career
At age 15, Bailey worked in a wild-west carnival as both a barker and an actor. He went on to work at other places as an usher, a waiter, and a guide at an automobile exhibit, among other jobs.

Bailey first worked in radio in Chicago. His mother had left the stage for the newer medium, and she helped him find work on soap operas. He moved to St. Louis when he was offered a job at radio station KWK, but he resumed acting when an executive at KWK made him the head of the station's stock company.

In 1936, Bailey went back to Chicago to get married and to perform with the Chicago Theater of the Air. He remained in Chicago until he had to go to the West Coast for some programs in 1942.

One of Bailey's earliest roles on radio was that of the title character in the comedy serial Mortimer Gooch (1936–37) on CBS. In the early 1940s Bailey was regularly featured on network radio programs originating from Chicago. He played the boyfriend of the title character's sister in That Brewster Boy and the father of the title character in Meet Corliss Archer. He played Bob Jones in Kitty Keene, Inc..

He was signed in 1943 by 20th Century-Fox and appeared in seven feature films; the first two (in which he was most prominent) starred Laurel and Hardy. After the studio failed to renew Bailey's one-year contract, he returned to radio.

Starting in 1946, Bailey starred as freelance detective George Valentine in the radio drama Let George Do It, but he is best remembered as the title character in the long-running radio series Yours Truly, Johnny Dollar. The program ran from 1949 to 1962 (it and Suspense were the last CBS radio drama series on the air until the CBS Radio Mystery Theater began in 1974) and featured the exploits of "America's fabulous freelance insurance investigator"; Bailey starred as Johnny from 1955 to 1960 and wrote the script for the December 22, 1957 episode "The Carmen Kringle Matter" using the pen name "Robert Bainter".

With CBS devoting more money to television and wanting to reduce costs, Yours Truly, Johnny Dollar relocated to New York in 1960 and Bailey, unwilling to relocate, was dismissed. Having performed in almost 500 episodes, he had made the role his own. With the end of his involvement, the show wound down over the following two years (with two different actors) before being taken off the air in 1962, by which time Bailey had virtually given up acting.

Near the end of the 1962 film Birdman of Alcatraz, he can be seen as one of the reporters gathered around Burt Lancaster and Edmond O'Brien. Bailey's role was only a bit, and most of his dialogue was dubbed by another actor.

Personal life 
In 1936, Bailey married Glorianna Royston, a model.

Last years and death

Bailey struggled with alcoholism, but did overcome his addiction. He ended up working in a rehab facility helping others with similar struggles. After suffering a stroke he was in a rest home for the last ten years of his life. He died in Lancaster, California, aged 70, on August 13, 1983.

Filmography

References

External links

 
 
Bob Bailey profile,  MWOTRC.com; accessed January 24, 2018.

1913 births
1983 deaths
American television actors
American male film actors
American male radio actors
20th-century American male actors
Male actors from Toledo, Ohio